Ao Vivo no Mosh (Portuguese for Live at the Mosh) is the debut album by Brazilian post-punk band Smack. Recorded live at the Estúdios Mosh in São Paulo (albeit without an audience), it was released in 1985 by Baratos Afins.

Track listing

"Fora Daqui" and "Mediocridade Afinal" were later re-released in the compilation album The Sexual Life of the Savages, released by Soul Jazz Records in 2005.

Reception
Ao Vivo no Mosh has been described as "a bouncingly vigorous slice of vinyl from Brazil's seldom exposed underground" by Spin columnist Andrea Enthal. Although originally well received by rock audiences, the album is now considered an obscurity and a collector's item. The album has been compared to the eponymous debut album by Legião Urbana, which was also released in 1985 and is considered a milestone in the Brazilian post-punk scene of the 1980s.

Personnel
 Sérgio "Pamps" Pamplona — vocals, guitar
 Thomas Pappon — drums
 Sandra Coutinho — bass
 Edgard Scandurra — guitar

References

External links
 Ao Vivo no Mosh at Discogs

1985 debut albums
Smack (Brazilian band) albums